Crăcăoani is a commune in Neamț County, Western Moldavia, Romania. It is composed of five villages: Cracăul Negru, Crăcăoani, Magazia, Mitocu Bălan and Poiana Crăcăoani. To the east lies Ghindăoani and to the north lies Bălțătești. The name is derived from the name of the river Cracău that runs through the village.

Culture
A traditional Moldavian folk music dance, performed with a fiddle and folk lute, is often performed in Crăcăoani.

Natives
 Gheorghe Răscănescu

References

Communes in Neamț County
Localities in Western Moldavia